The Wonder Show of the World is a collaborative studio album by Bonnie "Prince" Billy & The Cairo Gang. It was released on Drag City in 2010.

Production
Will Oldham wrote the lyrics for the album, while Emmett Kelly wrote the music.

Critical reception
American Songwriter wrote that the album "is polished with smooth blues-guitar wanderings, sparse yet catchy percussion arrangements, and a wealth of reverberating ‘60’s psychedelic choral harmonies." The Guardian wrote that Oldham's "intensity forces our concentration, though, unlike Neil Young, he never extends empathy, only demands it."

Track listing

Personnel
Credits adapted from liner notes.

 Bonnie "Prince" Billy – music
 The Cairo Gang – music
 Shahzad Ismaily – bass guitar, percussion, vocals
 Phil Elverum – vocals (5, 10)
 Tusi – recording
 Paul Oldham – mastering
 Chris Kelly – artwork
 Joanne Oldham – artwork
 Dan Osborn – layout

Charts

References

External links
 

2010 albums
Collaborative albums
Will Oldham albums
Drag City (record label) albums
Domino Recording Company albums